The Dinkelberg is a partially forested hill range, up to , about 145 km² in area, in the High Rhine region of Germany. It lies within the counties of Lörrach and Waldshut in the German state of Baden-Württemberg and the Swiss canton of Basel-Stadt. It is on the southwestern edge of the Southern Black Forest, from which it is geologically distinct.

Geography

Location 
The Dinkelberg lies mainly in the county of Lörrach, but its eastern part in the area of the Wehra valley belongs to the county of Waldshut (both in Germany) and a smaller element in the west is part of the canton of Basel-Stadt in Switzerland. It is bounded in the south by the valley of the High Rhine, in the north and west by the Wiese valley and in the esat by the Wehra valley. It lies between the larger settlements of Schopfheim to the north, Wehr to the east, Rheinfelden to the south and Lörrach and the Homburg Forest to the west. Its highest hill is the Hohe Flum (536.2 m), on which is an open observation tower and an eponymous hotel-restaurant.

Hills 
Amongst the hills and foothills of the Dinkelberg are the following, sorted by height in metres (m) above sea level, based on the NHN reference system in Germany and the Meter über Meer (m ü. M.) in Switzerland:
 Hohe Flum (536.2 m; GE), south-southwest of  Wiechs; with its observation tower
 Hirzenleck (523.4 m; GE), 1 km north of Herten; with the Eigenturm observation tower
 St. Chrischona (522 m; SW), in Bettingen-Chrischona; with the  St. Chrischona TV tower
 Mauerhaldebuck (493.3 m; GE), southeast of Maulburg
 Mezelhöhe (Metzelhöhe; 487.1 m; GE), 2 km east-northeast of Salzert
 Eichberg (477.7 m; GE), northwest of Degerfelden
 Schachbühl (465.9 m; GE), 1.4 km north of  Dossenbach
 Schindelberg (419.0 m; GE), east of

Waterbodies 
Amongst the rivers and streams of the Dinkelberg are the  Löhrgraben, which flows into the Wiese near , the Bachtelengraben, which empties into the Rhine near Schwörstadt-Unterdorf, the Dürrenbach, which discharges into the Rhine at Rheinfelden and the Hagenbacher Bach and the Waidbach, the headstreams of the Großbach (also called the Warmbach), which also flows into the Rhine, at Rheinfelden-Warmbach.

Amongst its lakes belongs the Eichener See near 
Schopfheim-Eichen.

Natural monuments 
 Eichener See near Schopfheim-Eichen
 Erdmanns Cave (Erdmannshöhle) or Hasler Cave (Hasler Höhle) on the edge of Hasel
 Teufelsloch, a funneldoline near Rheinfelden-Nordschwaben
 Teufelsloch, funnel doline near Rheinfelden-Karsau
 Tschamber Cave (Tschamberhöhle) in Rheinfelden-Karsau, village of Riedmatt

Settlements 
Towns and villages in and around the Dinkelberg region are (clockwise from the north): 

 Maulburg 
 Schopfheim
 Wehr
 Schwörstadt
 Minseln
 Eichsel
 Adelhausen
 Rheinfelden 
 Inzlingen
 Grenzach-Wyhlen
 Lörrach
 Steinen

Literature 
 Friedrich Disch: Studien zur Kulturgeographie des Dinkelberges. Bundesanstalt für Landeskunde, Bad Godesberg, 1971.
 Hermann Wider: Der Dinkelberg. In: Geschichtsverein Markgräflerland (Hrsg.): Das Markgräflerland. Beiträge zu seiner Geschichte und Kultur. Schopfheim, 2010, 1, pp. 4–46.

References

External links 

 Offizielle Website der Interessengemeinschaft Dinkelberg (Vereinigung von Gemeinden, Vereinen und Verbänden im Dinkelberg)
 Schwarzwald Tourismus GmbH: Dinkelberg
 Private Website zur Geologie des Dinkelbergs

Hill ranges of Germany
Landforms of Baden-Württemberg
Regions of Baden-Württemberg
Mountain ranges of Switzerland
Lörrach (district)
Waldshut (district)
Geography of Basel-Stadt
Natural regions of the South German Scarplands
Special Areas of Conservation in Germany